Marco Gastón Ruben Rodríguez (born 26 October 1986) is an Argentine former professional footballer who played as striker.

He spent the better part of his 18-year career with Rosario Central, scoring 105 goals in all competitions. He also played in Spain, Ukraine, France, Mexico and Brazil.

Ruben won one cap for the Argentina national team, in 2011.

Club career
Born in Capitán Bermúdez, Santa Fe Province, Ruben started his career with Rosario Central in 2004. In the 2006 Apertura tournament he scored seven goals in 17 matches to be the team's top scorer, and this brought him to the attention of several major clubs in Argentina and Europe, with Club Atlético River Plate eventually winning the battle and paying US$7.5 million for his signature, alongside teammates Juan Ojeda and Cristian Villagra.

After a short spell, Manuel Pellegrini's Villarreal CF purchased Ruben for $7 million in January 2008, immediately loaning him to fellow La Liga side Recreativo de Huelva until 30 June. He made his league debut in Spain on the 27th, appearing as a substitute and being booked in the 3–1 home loss against Getafe CF.

The loan was renewed for the 2008–09 season, but Ruben scored just three times as the Andalusians were relegated. After returning to Villarreal, he spent the vast majority of the year with the reserves, which were having their first experience in the Segunda División.

In mid-January 2010, Villarreal agreed to sell Ruben to Wigan Athletic of the Premier League after the player had helped the reserves to the fourth place with nine league goals, good enough for joint-third. Although the player agreed personal terms with Wigan, the clubs could not reach an agreement and the deal fell through.

Ruben played his first league game with Villarreal's main squad on 7 February 2010, more than two years after his purchase, appearing six minutes at RCD Mallorca (1–0 loss). On 9 January of the following year, while starting in the place of injured Nilmar, he scored against Real Madrid to make it 2–1 for the Valencians (his first goal for the first team), who were eventually defeated at the Santiago Bernabéu Stadium (4–2).

On 13 July 2012, Ruben signed a five-year contract with Ukrainian club FC Dynamo Kyiv for a €14 million fee. He scored his first goal for his new team on 3 November, netting the first in a 2–0 home win over SC Tavriya Simferopol.

After a spell in the French Ligue 1 with Thonon Évian F.C. where he failed to meet expectations as that particular type of football did not suit his style, Ruben joined Liga MX side Tigres UANL on 18 June 2014 on a one-year loan from Dynamo. He made his competitive debut on 9 July, playing the whole of a 4–1 defeat to Monarcas Morelia in the Supercopa MX.

Ruben returned to Rosario Central on 24 December 2014, initially on a temporary deal. He scored a career-best 21 goals in his first year (24 in all competitions) and was named team captain.

On 11 January 2019, Ruben joined Brazil's Club Athletico Paranaense on a year-long loan. He retired on 7 May 2022 at the age of 35 after scoring for Rosario in the 3–1 win over Estudiantes de La Plata at Estadio Gigante de Arroyito, as the club's third all-time scorer with 105 goals.

International career
Ruben made his debut for Argentina in an unofficial pre-Olympic preparation match against Guatemala in February 2008, scoring once in a 5–0 win. His first official appearance took place on 5 June 2011 in a friendly with Poland, and he netted the 1–1 equaliser in an eventual 2–1 loss.

Career statistics

Club

International

Scores and results list Argentina's goal tally first, score column indicates score after each Ruben goal.

Honours
Rosario Central
Copa Argentina: 2017–18

Athletico Paranaense
Copa do Brasil: 2019
J.League Cup / Copa Sudamericana Championship: 2019

References

External links

1986 births
Living people
People from San Lorenzo Department
Argentine people of Spanish descent
Sportspeople from Santa Fe Province
Argentine footballers
Association football forwards
Argentine Primera División players
Rosario Central footballers
Club Atlético River Plate footballers
La Liga players
Segunda División players
Villarreal CF players
Villarreal CF B players
Recreativo de Huelva players
Ukrainian Premier League players
FC Dynamo Kyiv players
Ligue 1 players
Thonon Evian Grand Genève F.C. players
Liga MX players
Tigres UANL footballers
Campeonato Brasileiro Série A players
Club Athletico Paranaense players
Argentina international footballers
Argentine expatriate footballers
Expatriate footballers in Spain
Expatriate footballers in Ukraine
Expatriate footballers in France
Expatriate footballers in Mexico
Expatriate footballers in Brazil
Argentine expatriate sportspeople in Spain
Argentine expatriate sportspeople in Ukraine
Argentine expatriate sportspeople in France
Argentine expatriate sportspeople in Mexico
Argentine expatriate sportspeople in Brazil